Hermetia concinna is a species of soldier fly in the family Stratiomyidae.

Distribution
Mexico, United States.

References

Stratiomyidae
Insects described in 1900
Taxa named by Samuel Wendell Williston
Diptera of North America